Vladimir Zosimovich Sarayev (28 April 1936 – 18 April 2010) was a Soviet football player.

Honours
 Soviet Top League winner: 1965.

International career
Sarayev made his debut for USSR on June 27, 1965 in a 1966 FIFA World Cup qualifier against Denmark. He was not selected for the final tournament squad.

External links
  Profile

1936 births
People from Sarapul
Russian footballers
Soviet footballers
Soviet Union international footballers
Soviet Top League players
FC Torpedo Moscow players
2010 deaths
Association football defenders
FC Izhevsk players
Sportspeople from Udmurtia